Maureen Kearney is an Irish whistleblower, an English teacher, and trade unionist at Areva. A union official of the CFDT, she was elected secretary of the European group committee of Areva in 2004, she alerted the press and politicians to the existence of a secret contract involving technology transfers to China, threatening the company.

Kearney was subjected to brutal police custody, having being accused of fabrication, taken up by the Ministry of Justice. She was cleared of it on appeal. Neither of the two courts "recognized her status as a victim", as this was "not the subject of the proceedings". She was heard by only one of the four investigating judges. She renounced her complaints for "kidnapping, violence with a weapon and rape".

Biography

Family, arrival in France and union involvement
Of Irish nationality, Kearney grew up in a family sensitive to trade unionism where it is customary to say that everyone “has two hands, one to help themselves and the second to help others”. Her mother campaigned for the release of Nelson Mandela in early 1990; Kearney became a feminist in high school. In the mid-1980s, she moved to France with her husband Gilles in the village of Auffargis, Yvelines.

After the birth of their daughter, in 1987, Kearney was hired by Société Générale pour les Techniques Nouvelles (SGN), a subsidiary of the Cogema group (future Areva), to teach English to technicians who went to work abroad. Outraged at having seen young engineers fired without compensation, she joined the CFDT, becoming its “figurehead” at Areva. Her “very good contact” and her ability to “discuss with the delegations of other nations” were praised there. As a result, this trade union team “often received information internally”, cross-checking it, to “know the strategic orientations” of Areva.

Secretary of the Areva group committee

2006-2010: Strikes and action against the dismantling of Areva
With all the elected staff of the CFDT and all the other Areva unions, it was carrying out several actions to defend the company and its employees. Supported by unions such as IG Metall in Germany or the CGIL in Italy, the group committee in which it participates called for strikes in the factories of the thirteen European countries where Areva's fifty-five sites are located. An expert report detailing the disadvantages of the planned sale of Areva T&D, a decisive step in a "sale of Areva" predicted that the group's workforce will fall to 19,000 employees worldwide in 2023, four times less than the 75,000 at the end of 2009.

This highly profitable subsidiary, selling electricity transmission and distribution equipment, was coveted in 2006 by Alstom, owned by the Bouygues group, because it had doubled its share of the rapidly growing world electrical interconnection market in just a few years,

In Summer 2007, Nicolas Sarkozy negotiated the takeover by Alstom-Bouygues of Areva T&D, coming up against strong opposition from the Areva group committee, which sounded “the alarm bell”, accumulating lobbying efforts. The HSBC bank and the American firm McKinsey, discreetly mandated by the State Participation Agency, do not encourage the project, McKinsey analyzing that this sale "would not generate synergies"19 while "the State does not would have nothing to gain from it”, according to HSBC, which rather recommends “the listing” of a portion of the capital of Areva. Anne Lauvergeon also evoked "pretty significant negative synergies" and the imperative of growth through its own strengths", in November 2007, after the sale to China of two EPR20 reactors, while the senior executives of Areva T&D signed on the unanimity an op-ed in Les Echos to denounce an operation which “would prevent full benefit from market opportunities in 2010-2011 and would leave room” for competitors ABB and Siemens.

In June 2009, Maureen Kearney led the Areva delegation received at the Elysée, which gave the assurance that this sale was ruled out.

The transfer finally took place in 2010, by decision of the government of François Fillon, coupled with the dismissal of Anne Lauvergeon, then personally weakened by the Uramin affair. In 2023, Areva is the subject of legal proceedings for embezzlement in its accounts, following the financial disaster caused by the collapse in the value of its Uramin securities.

2012: Alert against technology transfers in China
The bonds of trust forged by the trade unionists of the European works council of Areva with Lauvergeon continued after her dismissal. She retains an honorary position at Areva, although paid, until mid-2012. The inter-union reacts to a new risk, that of the consequences on jobs of a technology transfer project, which appears in 2012 in the form of a secret contract signed [ref. necessary] with China.

Kearney became aware of it via a whistleblower and herself became a whistleblower with politicians, much to the anger of new CEO Luc Oursel. François Fillon was alerted in 2011. At first, Oursel denied the existence of such a contract. Before and after the 2012 presidential election, Kearney and the intersyndicale meet ministers and deputies. Several deputies, worried, told L'Expansion that they wanted a parliamentary commission of inquiry; the government asks to “temporize, the time to carry out verifications”.

Meanwhile, the press confirms and relays the alerts concerning the negotiations which persist with Chinese companies concerning an international collaboration for nuclear projects. On 27 September 2012, Le Nouvel Obs published excerpts from a draft bipartite agreement between EDF and its partner CGNPC. On 3 October 2022, Le Canard enchaîné published a note from the APE (State Holdings Agency), entitled “alert relating to a draft cooperation agreement between EDF and CGNPC”.

2012: intimidation, threats, rape and acts of barbarism
Despite the support of her inter-union, Kearney was the subject of anonymous threats which she described to journalists from L'Express she met at the end of October 2012. Her daughter told her that she felt that she was being followed. On 20 November, the Areva group committee unanimously voted a motion30 asking the CEO for the latest version of the tripartite agreement, signed on 19 October 2012 between Areva, EDF and the Chinese company CGNPC, specifying that a refusal would constitute an offence of obstruction. He still doesn't get it.

On 15 December, Ministers of the Interior Bernard Cazeneuve and of the Economy Arnaud Montebourg were contacted personally by Kearney and responded to her messages. The intimidation is repeated, forcing him to consult a psychiatrist and begin treatment. A few days later, on 17 December, she was the victim of a brutal rape in her house, tied to a chair. The aggressor threatens her with death: “this is the second warning, there won't be a third”. The housekeeper discovered her six hours later and wants to call the police; Kearney refused, citing fears of reprisals. It is finally her husband who imposed the call.

The rape was revealed the next day by Libération, of which Lauvergeon chaired the supervisory board and confirmed by the CFDT and the Versailles prosecutor's office, which revealed ten days later that the letter had been engraved with a knife on the woman's abdomen. The trade unionists of the CFDT meet the DRH so that it is protected as a whistleblower. Two days after the rape, Areva announced to AFP that it was filing a complaint against the newspaper, which reported in a separate article on the concerns of the group committee. Michel Toudret, CFDT central delegate from Areva confirmed to the press that the unions “fear technology transfers with China” and that Maureen Kearney received threatening phone calls. The union also asked the press “to observe the greatest reserve in the name of the right to the preservation of one’s person, relatives and friends”.

2012: EDF industrial projects with China
Lauvergeon was heard by the investigators on 20 December 2012 and on 26 December, Le Canard Enchaîné revealed that Montebourg commissioned an investigation by the General Inspectorate of Finance (IGF) on the draft agreement between EDF and the Chinese company CGNPC.

L'Express revealed the same week that teams from EDF and the Chinese CGNPC continue to "work together", in Guangzhou, on "a nuclear reactor project competing with Atmea" (d' Areva) with “transfer requests” for part of its central architecture, for which Areva would be seven years ahead of its competitors”. L'Express specifies that the talks are progressing without Areva, whereas in February 2011 the French Nuclear Policy Committee (CPN) had decided: EDF can only join CGNPC with Areva28. The CEO of Areva replied on 30 December in an interview with the JDD that the “transfer of technology to China” will only be done “on a case-by-case basis”.

References

External links 

Date of birth missing (living people)
Living people
Irish emigrants to France
Irish whistleblowers
French Democratic Confederation of Labour members
Areva people
Irish trade unionists
Irish feminists